"We Can't Hide It Anymore" is an American pop music song written by Barry Murphy and first recorded by Larry Santos. It appeared on Santos' 1975 album Casablanca and the single reached number 36 on Billboard magazine's Billboard Hot 100 chart in April 1976.

Chart performance

Cover versions
It was also recorded by Richie Havens for his 1976 album The End of the Beginning;
The trio Facts of Life covered the song on their 1978 album A Matter of Fact.

References

1976 singles
1975 songs
Larry Santos songs